Senator Catlin may refer to:

Abijah Catlin (1805–1891), Connecticut State Senate
Amos P. Catlin (1823–1900), California State Senate
George S. Catlin (1808–1851), Connecticut State Senate